Parrsboro Regional High School also known as PRHS is a school located in Parrsboro, Nova Scotia, Canada. PRHS consists of six grades- 7,8,9,10,11 and 12, with approximately 150 students and with 1 class per grade.

PRHS is located on King Street in Parrsboro, N.S. Students attend both schools from about a twenty-five kilometre radius. PRHS students come from surrounding communities such as Five Islands, Southampton and Port Greville.

The school's sports teams are called the Warriors. PRHS has a volleyball, softball, badminton, soccer and basketball team.

The current principal of Parrsboro Regional High School is Paula Rochon.

References

External links
 official website

Middle schools in Nova Scotia
High schools in Nova Scotia
Schools in Cumberland County, Nova Scotia